Rory J. Scovel (born August 6, 1980) is an American comedian, actor, and writer. He released his first stand-up comedy album Dilation in 2011. He has since released the stand-up specials The Charleston Special (2015), Rory Scovel Tries Stand-Up for the First Time (2017), and Live Without Fear (2021).

As an actor, he began his career on as part of the main cast on the sitcoms Ground Floor (2013–2015) and Those Who Can't (2016–2019), co-starred in the romantic comedy film I Feel Pretty (2018), and also appeared in and wrote for the comedy series The Eric Andre Show (2012–2016). In the 2020s, he created and starred in his Comedy Central series Robbie (2020) and currently stars in the Apple TV+ series Physical (2021–present).

Early life
Rory J. Scovel was born in Greenville, South Carolina, on August 6, 1980. He has six siblings. He played basketball, tennis, and soccer as a child, and has described himself as hyperactive and a class clown. He attended St. Mary's Catholic School, then Christ Church Episcopal School, from kindergarten through eighth grade. He graduated from Greenville Senior High School in 1999. Scovel spent one year attending the University of Central Florida before enrolling at University of South Carolina Upstate, from which he graduated with a communications degree in 2003. While there, he played Division II soccer.

Career

Comedy
Scovel first performed comedy in December 2003 at an open mic night in Spartanburg, South Carolina. He had just graduated from college and was working as a cameraman at the local television stations WSPA. The following year, he moved to Washington D.C., where he performed for three years. He then moved to New York City, where he performed for three years until he moved to Los Angeles, where he now lives.

In 2006, Scovel participated in the Seattle International Comedy Competition; he made it to the finals.

In 2010, he performed his first set for a late night show on Late Night with Jimmy Fallon. The following year, Scovel performed on Conan with comedian Jon Dore using the premise that the show had accidentally booked two comedians; Scovel would go on to perform on and be interviewed by Conan many times in the following decade. Scovel also released his first stand-up album with Stand Up! Records, Dilation. Scovel and the record were named by The Huffington Post as one of fourteen in their "Guide To New Comedy Albums of 2011".

In 2012, Scovel was named among the 10 Comics to Watch by Variety magazine. In April of that year, his half-hour set was featured on Comedy Central's The Half Hour. In 2013, he performed a show at the performance venue at Third Man Records, Jack White's record label. The live show was recorded to tape and transferred to vinyl. There is no digital version of this recording. White would later executive produce Scovel's 2017 special for Netflix.

In 2015, Scovel taped his first hour-long stand-up special at the Woolfe Street Playhouse in Charleston, South Carolina; the special was aptly named Rory Scovel: The Charleston Special. In 2017, his next special, Rory Scovel Tries Stand-Up for the First Time, was released by Netflix.

Scovel has opened for comedians such as Louis C.K., Nick Swardson, and Daniel Tosh. He has performed at the Montreal Just for Laughs Festival, the FYF Fest in Los Angeles, the Vancouver Comedy Festival, the Del Close Improv Marathon in New York, the Bumbershoot Festival in Seattle, and the Chicago Improv Festival.

Television and movies 
Scovel's breakthrough acting role was as Harvard in the TBS sitcom Ground Floor. He was a main character for both seasons of the show, which aired from 2013 to 2015. Following the cancellation of Ground Floor, Scovel joined the main cast of Those Who Can't, which began airing on TruTV in 2016, reprising his role as Principal Quinn from the 2013 Amazon film of the same name. He had various small acting and voice acting roles throughout the 2010s, including recurring roles on MTV's Zach Stone Is Gonna Be Famous, NBC's Undateable, and TBS' Wrecked. Scovel had a small role in Demetri Martin's indie comedy film Dean. He had a supporting role in the 2017 wide-release comedy The House. Notably, he starred as the main love interest in the 2018 Amy Schumer comedy film I Feel Pretty.

Scovel was part of the writing staff for the second and fourth seasons of The Eric Andre Show, which aired in 2013 and 2016, respectively. He was featured in the show's "New Years Eve Spooktacular" as well as an episode in season two where he played the fictional Chef Rory Scovel.

In November 2018, it was announced that Comedy Central had green-lit an eight-episode scripted television series produced, co-written, and starring Scovel, called Robbie. In a February 2020 interview, Scovel disclosed that the show had been produced and was looking for a distributor. On May 6, 2020, Comedy Central announced that Robbie would premiere later that week. The show premiered on May 7, 2020, at which time Comedy Central released the series in its entirety on its streaming platform and YouTube. Robbie is Comedy Central's first binge-release. Recently, Scovel played the lead in the Chris Blake quarantine comedy, Distancing Socially filmed remotely using the iPhone 11. The film was acquired and released by Cinedigm in October 2021.

Podcasts
Since 2018, Scovel has co-hosted The Pen Pals Podcast with fellow comedian Daniel Van Kirk. Scovel has appeared on several popular podcasts, including Conan O'Brien Needs a Friend with Conan O'Brien, Comedy Bang! Bang! with Scott Aukerman, Doug Loves Movies with Doug Benson, Sklarbro Country with The Sklar Brothers, The Nerdist Podcast with Chris Hardwick, You Made It Weird with Pete Holmes, Maximum Fun's Stop Podcasting Yourself, The Dead Authors Podcast with Paul F. Tompkins, The Dollop live at the 2016 Riot LA Comedy Festival with Dave Anthony and Gareth Reynolds, The Todd Glass Show, and WTF with Marc Maron, Mega, and Films to Be Buried With with Brett Golstein.

Personal life 
Scovel is married to actress Jordan Boughrum. They live in Los Angeles, where their daughter was born in 2015.

Filmography

Stand up specials 
Dilation (2011); Stand Up! Records
 Rory Scovel Live at Third Man Records (2013); Third Man Records
Rory Scovel: The Charleston Special (2015); Seeso
Rory Scovel Tries Stand-Up for the First Time (2017); Netflix
Rory Scovel: Live Without Fear (2021); YouTube

Films

Television

As actor

As himself

References

External links
 
 

American stand-up comedians
American comedy writers
American male comedians
Living people
Writers from Greenville, South Carolina
1980 births
American male television actors
Actors from Greenville, South Carolina
American male film actors
American male voice actors
21st-century American male actors
21st-century American comedians
USC Upstate Spartans men's soccer players
Association footballers not categorized by position
Stand Up! Records artists
Third Man Records artists
Greenville Senior High School (Greenville, South Carolina) alumni
Association football players not categorized by nationality